Adam Pietraszko (born 18 August 1982) is a former speedway rider from Poland.

Speedway career
He rode in the top tier of British Speedway riding for the Oxford Cheetahs during the 2006 Elite League speedway season. He began his British career riding for Berwick Bandits in 2004.

References 

1982 births
Living people
Polish speedway riders
Berwick Bandits riders
Oxford Cheetahs riders
Peterborough Panthers riders